Luna Wedler (born 26 October 1999) is a Swiss actress. She gained popularity by starring in the 2020 Netflix series Biohackers.

Early life
Wedler grew up alongside two siblings in Zürich's District 6.

She studied contemporary dance between 2016 and 2018 at the European Film Actor School in Zürich.

Career
Wedler had her debut in 2015, starring in Niklaus Hilbers' film Amateur Teens. In an interview, she said she applied for her first movie role at 14 years of age "just like that". Since then, acting has fascinated her, especially embodying characters with dark sides. At the age of 17, she starred in Blue My Mind, in which her character moves to a new school and indulges in a lifestyle of excess involving wild parties, drugs, and sex. She tells in retrospect: "This role affected me psychologically and demanded everything from me".

She went on to appear in a number of films, including The Most Beautiful Girl in the World (2018), as well as television series such as The Team.

In August 2020, Netflix released the techno-thriller series Biohackers. Wedler holds the lead role on the show, in which she seeks revenge for the death of her twin brother. A second season was released in July 2021.

Beginning in May 2021 and ending in the spring of 2022, Wedler played Sophie Scholl in an Instagram project that portrayed the White Rose activist's final year of life.

Filmography

Film
{| class="wikitable sortable"
|+ 
! Year
! Title
! Role
! class="unsortable" | Notes
|-
|2015
|Amateur Teens
| Milena
|
|-
|rowspan=2|2018
|Blue My Mind
|Mia
|
|-
|The Most Beautiful Girl in the World
|Roxy
|
|-
|rowspan=2|2021
|Je suis Karl
|Maxi
|
|-
|The Story of My Wife
|Grete
|
|-
| rowspan=1|2023
| Ingeborg Bachmann – Journey into the Desert| Marianne Oellers
|
|-
|}

Television

Awards and recognition
 2018: Shooting Stars Award
 2018: Swiss Film Award - Best Actress for Blue My Mind 2018: Günter-Rohrbach-Filmpreis for The Most Beautiful Girl in the World, together with Aaron Hilmer
 2019: New Faces Award - Best Young Actress for The Most Beautiful Girl in the World 2020: Bavarian Film Awards - Best Young Actress
 2021: German Film Award - nominated for Best Actress, Je Suis Karl''

References

External links
 
 

Living people
1999 births
21st-century Swiss actresses
Actors from Zürich
Swiss film actresses
Swiss television actresses